Charalambos Konstantinidis (born 25 June 1985, in Charleroi) is a Belgian football player of Greek descent, he currently plays for RJS Heppignies-Lambusart-Fleurus.

Career
Konstantinidis began his career 1990 with RES Couvin-Mariembourg, before was transferred in summer 1992 to R.O.C. de Charleroi-Marchienne, after eleven years with ROC Charleroi signed for local rival R. Charleroi S.C. He played two years in the youth side for Charleroi and joined than in 2005 to R.A.E.C. Mons in the Belgian First Division. He signed on 20 May 2008 for Nea Salamis and was in October 2008 released from his contract with the Cyprus club. He turned back to his homeland Belgium and signed for a half-year with Royale Entente Sportive Couvin-Mariembourg. In summer joined from Royale Entente Sportive Couvin-Mariembourg on 12 August 2009 to Boussu Dour Borinage.

References

1985 births
Living people
Belgian footballers
Belgian people of Greek descent
R.A.E.C. Mons players
Association football goalkeepers
R. Charleroi S.C. players
Belgian Pro League players
Cypriot Second Division players
Nea Salamis Famagusta FC players
Expatriate footballers in Cyprus
R. Olympic Charleroi Châtelet Farciennes players
Sportspeople from Charleroi
Footballers from Hainaut (province)
Francs Borains players